David Burr may refer to:

 David C. Burr (1783–1827), American state legislator from Maine and Massachusetts 
 David H. Burr, (1803–1875) American cartographer, surveyor and topographer
 David Judson Burr, (1820–1876) American state legislator from Virginia
 David Burr (Canadian politician), Mayor of Windsor, Ontario from 1986 to 1988